This is a list of metropolitan areas in Poland.

See also
 Largest cities of Poland
 List of metropolitan areas in Europe
 List of metropolitan areas in Germany
 Largest metropolitan areas in the Nordic countries

References

External links 
 Union of Polish Metropolises (UMP) 

 
Poland
Poland geography-related lists